Sisa may refer to:
SISA, Società Italiana Servizi Aerei, Italian airline and flight training school associated with Cantieri Aeronautici e Navali Triestini (C.R.D.A Canterei), later merged with other airlines to form Ala Littoria
Solomon Islands Scout Association
Sisa (1999 film), 1999 Filipino film 
Sisa (drug), a methamphetamine derivative
Sisa Waqa, Fijian rugby league footballer
, Italian supermarket chain
Jaume Sisa (b. 1948), Catalan singer-songwriter
989 Studios (formerly Sony Interactive Studios America or SISA), American video game company

See also